Neivamyrmex swainsonii is a species of army ant in the family Formicidae.

References

Further reading

 

Dorylinae
Articles created by Qbugbot
Insects described in 1840